Shinya Tsuruoka (鶴岡 慎也, born April 11, 1981 in Kagoshima, Japan) is a Japanese professional baseball catcher for the Hokkaido Nippon-Ham Fighters in Japan's Nippon Professional Baseball.

External links

NPB.com

1981 births
Baseball people from Kagoshima Prefecture
Fukuoka SoftBank Hawks players
Hokkaido Nippon-Ham Fighters players
Japanese baseball coaches
Japanese baseball players
Living people
Nippon Ham Fighters players
Nippon Professional Baseball catchers
Nippon Professional Baseball coaches